The 1856 United States presidential election in Iowa took place on November 4, 1856, as part of the 1856 United States presidential election. Voters chose four representatives, or electors to the Electoral College, who voted for president and vice president.

Iowa voted for the Republican candidate, John C. Frémont, over Democratic candidate, James Buchanan and American Party candidate Millard Fillmore. Frémont won Iowa by a margin of 8.13%.

Buchanan is the second of only 6 US presidents and the first of 4 Democratic presidents to have never won Iowa.

Results

See also
 United States presidential elections in Iowa

References

Iowa
1856
1856 Iowa elections